Jalandhar Lok Sabha constituency (formerly known as Jullundur Lok Sabha constituency) is one of the 13 Lok Sabha constituencies in Punjab state in northern India. It is reserved for schedule caste.

Assembly segments
Presently, after delimitation, this constituency comprises the following nine Vidhan Sabha segments:

Old assembly segments
Before delimitation of the parliamentary constituencies in 2008, this constituency comprised the following nine Vidhan Sabha (Legislative Assembly) segments:
 Jullundur Cantonment
 Jullundur North
 Jullundur Central
 Jullundur South
 Kartarpur
 Lohian
 Nakodar
 Kapurthala
 Sultanpur

Members of Parliament

Election results

2019

2014

2009

1998

See also
 Jalandhar district
 List of Constituencies of the Lok Sabha

Notes

External links
Jalandhar lok sabha  constituency election 2019 result details

Lok Sabha constituencies in Punjab, India
Jalandhar district